The Life of Moses is a 1909 American silent epic film directed by J. Stuart Blackton and starring Pat Hartigan, Julia Arthur and William J. Humphrey. A portrayal of the biblical story of Moses, it was one of a number of prestige film based on historical or religious subjects made during the era.

It was produced by the Vitagraph Company, a leading early film studio. Relating five different events in Moses' life, it lasted five reels. It met great resistance from movie theater owners, who preferred shorter films that allowed them to change their audience much faster. Although often shown in five separate parts, the successful screening of the entire film in single sittings was influential in the gradual move away from short one or two reel films towards feature film production.

Cast
 Pat Hartigan as Moses
 Julia Arthur
 William J. Humphrey
 Charles Kent
 Edith Storey

Preservation status
The film is preserved in the Library of Congress collection.

References

Bibliography
  Dewey, Donald. Buccaneer: James Stuart Blackton and the Birth of American Movies. Rowman & Littlefield, 2016.

External links
 

1909 drama films
1909 films
American black-and-white films
Silent American drama films
American silent feature films
1900s English-language films
Films based on the Book of Exodus
Films directed by J. Stuart Blackton
Vitagraph Studios films
Portrayals of Moses in film
1900s American films